Johann Georg Leopold von Versen (Steinbusch, December 31, 1791 – Crampe, November 1, 1868), was a German Military and Nobleman.

Career
He was the Lord of Klausdorf in the Grand Duchy of Mecklenburg-Schwerin and a Major of the Prussian Army.

Marriage and children
He married firstly in Wurchow, on May 3, 1826, Hulda Wilhelmine Luise Henriette Leopoldine Ottilie von Glasenapp (Berlin, June 16, 1810 – Karlskau, September 25, 1843), and had issue, among whom a son Maximilian Felix Christoph Wilhelm Leopold Reinhold Albert Fürchtegott von Versen.

References

1791 births
1868 deaths
German untitled nobility